The 2006 Pittsburgh Pirates season was the 125th season of the franchise; the 120th in the National League. This was their sixth season at PNC Park. The Pirates finished fifth in the National League Central with a record of 67–95.

Regular season

Season standings

Game log

|- style="background:#fbb;"
| 1 || April 3 || @ Brewers || 2–5 || Lehr || Torres (0–1) || Turnbow || 45,023 || 0–1
|- style="background:#fbb;"
| 2 || April 4 || @ Brewers || 5–7 || Capuano || Santos (0–1) || Turnbow || 15,515 || 0–2
|- style="background:#fbb;"
| 3 || April 5 || @ Brewers || 2–3 || Wise || Marte (0–1) || Turnbow || 15,430 || 0–3
|- style="background:#fbb;"
| 4 || April 6 || @ Reds || 5–6 || White || Gonzalez (0–1) || Weathers || 13,887 || 0–4
|- style="background:#fbb;"
| 5 || April 7 || @ Reds || 6–7 || Milton || Maholm (0–1) || Mercker || 16,573 || 0–5
|- style="background:#fbb;"
| 6 || April 8 || @ Reds || 9–11 || Harang || Perez (0–1) || White || 20,244 || 0–6
|- style="background:#cfc;"
| 7 || April 9 || @ Reds || 5–3 || Santos (1–1) || Williams || Hernandez (1) || 22,090 || 1–6
|- style="background:#fbb;"
| 8 || April 10 || Dodgers || 3–8 || Perez || Duke (0–1) || — || 39,129 || 1–7
|- style="background:#cfc;"
| 9 || April 11 || Dodgers || 7–6 || Torres (1–1) || Carter || Gonzalez (1) || 17,240 || 2–7
|- style="background:#cfc;"
| 10 || April 12 || Dodgers || 9–5 || Torres (2–1) || Kuo || — || 13,237 || 3–7
|- style="background:#fbb;"
| 11 || April 13 || Dodgers || 5–13 || Lowe || Perez (0–2) || — || 18,134 || 3–8
|- style="background:#fbb;"
| 12 || April 14 || Cubs || 6–11 || Marshall || Santos (1–2) || — || 20,233 || 3–9
|- style="background:#cfc;"
| 13 || April 15 || Cubs || 2–1 || Duke (1–1) || Williams || Gonzalez (2) || 34,264 || 4–9
|- style="background:#fbb;"
| 14 || April 16 || Cubs || 3–7 || Rusch || Snell (0–1) || — || 15,020 || 4–10
|- style="background:#fbb;"
| 15 || April 17 || Cardinals || 1–2 || Marquis || Maholm (0–2) || Isringhausen || 15,278 || 4–11
|- style="background:#cfc;"
| 16 || April 18 || Cardinals || 12–4 || Perez (1–2) || Suppan || — || 16,682 || 5–11
|- style="background:#fbb;"
| 17 || April 19 || Cardinals || 0–4 || Carpenter || Santos (1–3) || — || 15,085 || 5–12
|- style="background:#fbb;"
| 18 || April 21 || @ Astros || 2–3 || Rodriguez || Duke (1–2) || Lidge || 31,333 || 5–13
|- style="background:#fbb;"
| 19 || April 22 || @ Astros || 0–3 || Buchholz || Snell (0–2) || Lidge || 38,575 || 5–14
|- style="background:#fbb;"
| 20 || April 23 || @ Astros || 2–7 || Oswalt || Maholm (0–3) || — || 39,074 || 5–15
|- style="background:#fbb;"
| 21 || April 24 || @ Cardinals || 2–7 || Carpenter || Perez (1–3) || — || 38,953 || 5–16
|- style="background:#fbb;"
| 22 || April 25 || @ Cardinals || 3–6 || Suppan || Santos (1–4) || Isringhausen || 38,809 || 5–17
|- style="background:#fbb;"
| 23 || April 26 || @ Cardinals || 3–4 || Isringhausen || Hernandez (0–1) || — || 38,728 || 5–18
|- style="background:#cfc;"
| 24 || April 28 || Phillies || 3–1 || Snell (1–2) || Myers || Gonzalez (3) || 30,568 || 6–18
|- style="background:#cfc;"
| 25 || April 29 || Phillies || 3–2 || Maholm (1–3) || Lidle || Hernandez (2) || 33,944 || 7–18
|- style="background:#fbb;"
| 26 || April 30 || Phillies || 1–5 || Floyd || Perez (1–4) || — || 22,320 || 7–19

|- style="background:#fbb;"
| 27 || May 1 || @ Cubs || 1–2 || Howry || Grabow (0–1) || Dempster || 36,602 || 7–20
|- style="background:#cfc;"
| 28 || May 2 || @ Cubs || 8–0 || Duke (2–2) || Guzman || — || 39,110 || 8–20
|- style="background:#fbb;"
| 29 || May 3 || @ Mets || 3–4  || Bradford || Gonzalez (0–2) || — || 33,668 || 8–21
|- style="background:#fbb;"
| 30 || May 4 || @ Mets || 0–6 || Glavine || Maholm (1–4) || — || 30,756 || 8–22
|- style="background:#fbb;"
| 31 || May 5 || @ Nationals || 0–6 || Day || Perez (1–5) || — || 21,059 || 8–23
|- style="background:#cfc;"
| 32 || May 6 || @ Nationals || 5–4  || Gonzalez (1–2) || Rodriguez || — || 29,953 || 9–23
|- style="background:#fbb;"
| 33 || May 7 || @ Nationals || 4–5 || O'Connor || Duke (2–3) || Cordero || 30,659 || 9–24
|- style="background:#cfc;"
| 34 || May 9 || Diamondbacks || 3–0 || Snell (2–2) || Batista || Gonzalez (4) || 16,961 || 10–24
|- style="background:#fbb;"
| 35 || May 10 || Diamondbacks || 4–7 || Webb || Marte (0–2) || Valverde || 14,509 || 10–25
|- style="background:#cfc;"
| 36 || May 12 || Marlins || 12–9 || Capps (1–0) || Wellemeyer || Gonzalez (5) || 24,990 || 11–25
|- style="background:#fbb;"
| 37 || May 13 || Marlins || 3–4 || Olsen || Duke (2–4) || Borowski || 29,289 || 11–26
|- style="background:#fbb;"
| 38 || May 14 || Marlins || 2–8 || Moehler || Snell (2–3) || — || 15,921 || 11–27
|- style="background:#cfc;"
| 39 || May 16 || Reds || 9–3 || Maholm (2–4) || Harang || — || 14,315 || 12–27
|- style="background:#cfc;"
| 40 || May 17 || Reds || 7–2 || Perez (2–5) || Arroyo || — || 14,897 || 13–27
|- style="background:#fbb;"
| 41 || May 18 || Reds || 8–9 || Belisle || Capps (1–1) || Coffey || 18,502 || 13–28
|- style="background:#fbb;"
| 42 || May 19 || @ Indians || 1–4 || Sabathia || Duke (2–5) || — || 32,499 || 13–29
|- style="background:#cfc;"
| 43 || May 20 || @ Indians || 9–6 || Snell (3–3) || Johnson || Gonzalez (6) || 30,799 || 14–29
|- style="background:#fbb;"
| 44 || May 21 || @ Indians || 2–3  || Wickman || Gonzalez (1–3) || — || 31,589 || 14–30
|- style="background:#fbb;"
| 45 || May 22 || @ Diamondbacks || 3–4 || Medders || Marte (0–3) || Valverde || 18,103 || 14–31
|- style="background:#fbb;"
| 46 || May 23 || @ Diamondbacks || 3–7 || Vargas || Santos (1–5) || — || 19,993 || 14–32
|- style="background:#fbb;"
| 47 || May 24 || @ Diamondbacks || 7–8 || Batista || Duke (2–6) || Valverde || 18,394 || 14–33
|- style="background:#cfc;"
| 48 || May 26 || Astros || 12–5 || Snell (4–3) || Buchholz || — || 29,247 || 15–33
|- style="background:#cfc;"
| 49 || May 27 || Astros || 8–7  || Santos (2–5) || Gallo || — || 31,878 || 16–33
|- style="background:#fbb;"
| 50 || May 28 || Astros || 4–5  || Qualls || Torres (2–2) || Lidge || 24,992 || 16–34
|- style="background:#cfc;"
| 51 || May 29 || Brewers || 14–3 || Duke (3–6) || Davis || — || 17,561 || 17–34
|- style="background:#cfc;"
| 52 || May 30 || Brewers || 12–1 || Santos (3–5) || De La Rosa || — || 14,300 || 18–34
|- style="background:#cfc;"
| 53 || May 31 || Brewers || 6–1 || Snell (5–3) || Capuano || — || 15,434 || 19–34

|- style="background:#cfc;"
| 54 || June 1 || Brewers || 4–3 || Grabow (1–1) || Turnbow || — || 12,899 || 20–34
|- style="background:#fbb;"
| 55 || June 2 || Padres || 0–7  || Park || Perez (2–6) || — || 20,777 || 20–35
|- style="background:#cfc;"
| 56 || June 3 || Padres || 6–4 || Duke (4–6) || Thompson || Gonzalez (7) || 30,639 || 21–35
|- style="background:#fbb;"
| 57 || June 4 || Padres || 0–1 || Young || Santos (3–6) || Hoffman || 26,857 || 21–36
|- style="background:#cfc;"
| 58 || June 5 || @ Rockies || 5–2 || Snell (6–3) || Cook || Gonzalez (8) || 20,152 || 22–36
|- style="background:#fbb;"
| 59 || June 6 || @ Rockies || 4–5 || Francis || Maholm (2–5) || Fuentes || 20,277 || 22–37
|- style="background:#fbb;"
| 60 || June 7 || @ Rockies || 9–16 || Dohmann || Perez (2–7) || — || 21,509 || 22–38
|- style="background:#fbb;"
| 61 || June 8 || @ Giants || 4–5 || Benitez || Marte (0–4) || — || 34,540 || 22–39
|- style="background:#cfc;"
| 62 || June 9 || @ Giants || 3–2 || Santos (4–6) || Morris || Gonzalez (9) || 38,766 || 23–39
|- style="background:#cfc;"
| 63 || June 10 || @ Giants || 2–0 || Snell (7–3) || Lowry || Gonzalez (10) || 37,302 || 24–39
|- style="background:#cfc;"
| 64 || June 11 || @ Giants || 7–5 || Capps (2–1) || Worrell || Gonzalez (11) || 39,850 || 25–39
|- style="background:#fbb;"
| 65 || June 13 || Cardinals || 1–2 || Carpenter || Perez (2–8) || Isringhausen || 24,443 || 25–40
|- style="background:#cfc;"
| 66 || June 14 || Cardinals || 9–7 || Duke (5–6) || Ponson || Gonzalez (12) || 20,289 || 26–40
|- style="background:#fbb;"
| 67 || June 15 || Cardinals || 5–6 || Mulder || Santos (4–7) || Isringhausen || 18,248 || 26–41
|- style="background:#fbb;"
| 68 || June 16 || Twins || 2–4 || Liriano || Snell (7–4) || Nathan || 33,025 || 26–42
|- style="background:#fbb;"
| 69 || June 17 || Twins || 3–5 || Crain || Marte (0–5) || Nathan || 34,085 || 26–43
|- style="background:#fbb;"
| 70 || June 18 || Twins || 2–8 || Santana || Perez (2–9) || — || 25,104 || 26–44
|- style="background:#fbb;"
| 71 || June 19 || Diamondbacks || 4–5  || Aquino || Torres (2–3) || Julio || 15,032 || 26–45
|- style="background:#fbb;"
| 72 || June 20 || @ Royals || 6–10 || Redman || Wells (0–1) || — || 15,906 || 26–46
|- style="background:#fbb;"
| 73 || June 21 || @ Royals || 4–6 || Dessens || Torres (2–4) || Burgos || 15,501 || 26–47
|- style="background:#fbb;"
| 74 || June 22 || @ Royals || 7–15 || Elarton || Maholm (2–6) || — || 13,153 || 26–48
|- style="background:#fbb;"
| 75 || June 23 || @ Dodgers || 4–10 || Tomko || Perez (2–10) || — || 55,823 || 26–49
|- style="background:#fbb;"
| 76 || June 24 || @ Dodgers || 0–7 || Sele || Duke (5–7) || — || 47,785 || 26–50
|- style="background:#fbb;"
| 77 || June 25 || @ Dodgers || 4–7 || Penny || Wells (0–2) || Saito || 55,545 || 26–51
|- style="background:#fbb;"
| 78 || June 27 || White Sox || 2–4 || Buehrle || Snell (7–5) || Jenks || 24,976 || 26–52
|- style="background:#fbb;"
| 79 || June 28 || White Sox || 3–4 || Garcia || Maholm (2–7) || Jenks || 23,118 || 26–53
|- style="background:#cfc;"
| 80 || June 29 || White Sox || 7–6 || Gonzalez (2–3) || Politte || — || 21,380 || 27–53
|- style="background:#fbb;"
| 81 || June 30 || Tigers || 6–7 || Colon || Wells (0–3) || Jones || 27,318 || 27–54

|- style="background:#cfc;"
| 82 || July 1 || Tigers || 9–2 || Capps (3–1) || Grilli || — || 37,111 || 28–54
|- style="background:#fbb;"
| 83 || July 2 || Tigers || 8–9 || Miner || Snell (7–6) || Jones || 28,136 || 28–55
|- style="background:#cfc;"
| 84 || July 3 || @ Mets || 11–1 || Maholm (3–7) || Maine || — || 54,111 || 29–55
|- style="background:#fbb;"
| 85 || July 4 || @ Mets || 6–7 || Sanchez || Hernandez (0–2) || Wagner || 38,487 || 29–56
|- style="background:#fbb;"
| 86 || July 5 || @ Mets || 0–5 || Hernandez || Wells (0–4) || — || 40,360 || 29–57
|- style="background:#fbb;"
| 87 || July 6 || @ Mets || 5–7 || Trachsel || Gorzelanny (0–1) || Wagner || 39,743 || 29–58
|- style="background:#cfc;"
| 88 || July 7 || @ Phillies || 3–2 || Snell (8–6) || Lieber || Gonzalez (13) || 45,025 || 30–58
|- style="background:#fbb;"
| 89 || July 8 || @ Phillies || 2–6 || Lidle || Maholm (3–8) || — || 37,462 || 30–59
|- style="background:#fbb;"
| 90 || July 9 || @ Phillies || 3–8 || Hamels || Duke (5–8) || — || 32,527 || 30–60
|- style="background:#FDB827"
| – || July 11 ||  || colspan=6 |  vs. 
|- style="background:#cfc;"
| 91 || July 14 || Nationals || 7–4 || Duke (6–8) || Ortiz || Gonzalez (14) || 26,720 || 31–60
|- style="background:#cfc;"
| 92 || July 15 || Nationals || 7–6 || Gonzalez (3–3) || Corcoran || — || 32,626 || 32–60
|- style="background:#fbb;"
| 93 || July 16 || Nationals || 4–8  || Stanton || Hernandez (0–3) || — || 18,908 || 32–61
|- style="background:#cfc;"
| 94 || July 17 || Rockies || 3–1 || Grabow (2–1) || Kim || Capps (1) || 18,835 || 33–61
|- style="background:#fbb;"
| 95 || July 18 || Rockies || 4–13 || Francis || Gorzelanny (0–2) || — || 20,086 || 33–62
|- style="background:#cfc;"
| 96 || July 19 || Rockies || 6–5 || Duke (7–8) || Jennings || Gonzalez (15) || 19,881 || 34–62
|- style="background:#cfc;"
| 97 || July 20 || @ Marlins || 5–3 || Torres (3–4) || Messenger || Gonzalez (16) || 9,139 || 35–62
|- style="background:#fbb;"
| 98 || July 21 || @ Marlins || 1–4 || Olsen || Maholm (3–9) || Borowski || 11,357 || 35–63
|- style="background:#fbb;"
| 99 || July 22 || @ Marlins || 0–5 || Nolasco || Wells (0–5) || — || 15,291 || 35–64
|- style="background:#fbb;"
| 100 || July 23 || @ Marlins || 4–5 || Borowski || Gonzalez (3–4) || — || 11,468 || 35–65
|- style="background:#fbb;"
| 101 || July 24 || @ Brewers || 8–12 || Davis || Duke (7–9) || — || 30,252 || 35–66
|- style="background:#cfc;"
| 102 || July 25 || @ Brewers || 6–1 || Snell (9–6) || Bush || — || 35,923 || 36–66
|- style="background:#cfc;"
| 103 || July 26 || @ Brewers || 8–4 || Maholm (4–9) || Capuano || — || 37,678 || 37–66
|- style="background:#cfc;"
| 104 || July 28 || Giants || 3–0 || Wells (1–5) || Schmidt || Gonzalez (17) || 38,092 || 38–66
|- style="background:#cfc;"
| 105 || July 29 || Giants || 4–3 || Gorzelanny (1–2) || Wright || Gonzalez (18) || 38,373 || 39–66
|- style="background:#cfc;"
| 106 || July 30 || Giants || 2–1  || Grabow (3–1) || Kline || — || 26,516 || 40–66

|- style="background:#fbb;"
| 107 || August 1 || Braves || 2–4 || Smoltz || Snell (9–7) || Wickman || 22,145 || 40–67
|- style="background:#fbb;"
| 108 || August 2 || Braves || 2–3 || Yates || Torres (3–5) || Wickman || 21,064 || 40–68
|- style="background:#cfc;"
| 109 || August 3 || Braves || 3–2 || Chacon (1–0) || Hudson || Gonzalez (19) || 17,324 || 41–68
|- style="background:#cfc;"
| 110 || August 4 || @ Cubs || 6–0 || Gorzelanny (2–2) || Zambrano || — || 39,973 || 42–68
|- style="background:#fbb;"
| 111 || August 5 || @ Cubs || 5–7 || Prior || Duke (7–10) || Dempster || 41,007 || 42–69
|- style="background:#fbb;"
| 112 || August 6 || @ Cubs || 1–6 || Hill || Snell (9–8) || — || 40,320 || 42–70
|- style="background:#fbb;"
| 113 || August 8 || @ Astros || 1–3 || Backe || Maholm (4–10) || Lidge || 38,856 || 42–71
|- style="background:#fbb;"
| 114 || August 9 || @ Astros || 1–14 || Oswalt || Chacon (1–1) || — || 31,077 || 42–72
|- style="background:#fbb;"
| 115 || August 10 || @ Astros || 2–5 || Clemens || Gorzelanny (2–3) || — || 41,476 || 42–73
|- style="background:#cfc;"
| 116 || August 11 || Cardinals || 7–1 || Duke (8–10) || Suppan || — || 30,516 || 43–73
|- style="background:#cfc;"
| 117 || August 12 || Cardinals || 3–2 || Snell (10–8) || Weaver || Gonzalez (20) || 35,037 || 44–73
|- style="background:#cfc;"
| 118 || August 13 || Cardinals || 7–0 || Maholm (5–10) || Marquis || — || 27,101 || 45–73
|- style="background:#cfc;"
| 119 || August 14 || Brewers || 4–2 || Santos (5–7) || Bush || Gonzalez (21) || 16,279 || 46–73
|- style="background:#fbb;"
| 120 || August 15 || Brewers || 3–6 || Davis || Marte (0–6) || Cordero || 17,877 || 46–74
|- style="background:#fbb;"
| 121 || August 16 || Brewers || 2–5  || Gonzalez || Marte (0–7) || Cordero || 14,901 || 46–75
|- style="background:#cfc;"
| 122 || August 18 || @ Reds || 7–3 || Snell (11–8) || Michalak || — || 31,718 || 47–75
|- style="background:#fbb;"
| 123 || August 19 || @ Reds || 7–14 || Franklin || Torres (3–6) || — || 34,245 || 47–76
|- style="background:#fbb;"
| 124 || August 20 || @ Reds || 1–5 || Harang || Santos (5–8) || — || 29,935 || 47–77
|- style="background:#fbb;"
| 125 || August 21 || @ Braves || 0–3 || Smoltz || Duke (8–11) || Wickman || 21,898 || 47–78
|- style="background:#cfc;"
| 126 || August 22 || @ Braves || 5–3 || Marte (1–7) || Baez || Gonzalez (22) || 21,830 || 48–78
|- style="background:#cfc;"
| 127 || August 23 || @ Braves || 5–4 || Capps (4–1) || Paronto || Gonzalez (23) || 23,082 || 49–78
|- style="background:#cfc;"
| 128 || August 24 || Astros || 5–3 || Maholm (6–10) || Rodriguez || Gonzalez (24) || 32,345 || 50–78
|- style="background:#fbb;"
| 129 || August 25 || Astros || 1–5 || Clemens || Santos (5–9) || — || 37,009 || 50–79
|- style="background:#fbb;"
| 130 || August 26 || Astros || 4–7 || Pettitte || Duke (8–12) || Lidge || 37,190 || 50–80
|- style="background:#fbb;"
| 131 || August 27 || Astros || 1–13 || Hirsh || Chacon (1–2) || — || 19,459 || 50–81
|- style="background:#cfc;"
| 132 || August 28 || Cubs || 11–6 || Snell (12–8) || Guzman || — || 12,666 || 51–81
|- style="background:#cfc;"
| 133 || August 29 || Cubs || 7–6  || Capps (5–1) || Dempster || — || 14,618 || 52–81
|- style="background:#cfc;"
| 134 || August 30 || Cubs || 10–9  || McLeary (1–0) || Dempster || — || 12,730 || 53–81

|- style="background:#fbb;"
| 135 || September 1 || @ Cardinals || 1–3 || Carpenter || Duke (8–13) || — || 42,091 || 53–82
|- style="background:#cfc;"
| 136 || September 2 || @ Cardinals || 1–0 || Capps (6–1) || Weaver || Torres (1) || 41,466 || 54–82
|- style="background:#fbb;"
| 137 || September 3 || @ Cardinals || 3–6 || Reyes || Snell (12–9) || — || 42,205 || 54–83
|- style="background:#cfc;"
| 138 || September 4 || @ Cubs || 5–4 || Maholm (7–10) || Zambrano || Torres (2) || 37,994 || 55–83
|- style="background:#cfc;"
| 139 || September 5 || @ Cubs || 6–5 || Grabow (4–1) || Dempster || Torres (3) || 31,494 || 56–83
|- style="background:#fbb;"
| 140 || September 6 || @ Cubs || 2–7 || Wuertz || Grabow (4–2) || — || 32,557 || 56–84
|- style="background:#cfc;"
| 141 || September 7 || @ Cubs || 7–5 || Bayliss (1–0) || Eyre || Torres (4) || 27,105 || 57–84
|- style="background:#fbb;"
| 142 || September 8 || @ Reds || 1–9 || Lohse || Snell (12–10) || — || 17,631 || 57–85
|- style="background:#cfc;"
| 143 || September 9 || @ Reds || 7–4 || Capps (7–1) || Coffey || Torres (5) || 25,038 || 58–85
|- style="background:#fbb;"
| 144 || September 10 || @ Reds || 2–4 || Arroyo || Youman (0–1) || Schoeneweis || 20,731 || 58–86
|- style="background:#cfc;"
| 145 || September 11 || Brewers || 4–3 || Duke (9–13) || Davis || Torres (6) || 13,643 || 59–86
|- style="background:#cfc;"
| 146 || September 13 || Brewers || 6–3 || Snell (13–10) || Capuano || Torres (7) || — || 60–86
|- style="background:#fbb;"
| 147 || September 13 || Brewers || 1–2 || Sheets || Chacon (1–3) || Cordero || 11,627 || 60–87
|- style="background:#cfc;"
| 148 || September 15 || Mets || 5–3 || Maholm (8–10) || Martinez || Torres (8) || 24,410 || 61–87
|- style="background:#cfc;"
| 149 || September 16 || Mets || 3–2 || Capps (8–1) || Heilman || — || 37,623 || 62–87
|- style="background:#cfc;"
| 150 || September 17 || Mets || 3–0 || Duke (10–13) || Maine || Torres (9) || 34,866 || 63–87
|- style="background:#cfc;"
| 151 || September 19 || @ Dodgers || 10–6 || Snell (14–10) || Kuo || — || 43,734 || 64–87
|- style="background:#cfc;"
| 152 || September 20 || @ Dodgers || 6–4 || Chacon (2–3) || Maddux || Torres (10) || 46,319 || 65–87
|- style="background:#fbb;"
| 153 || September 21 || @ Dodgers || 2–5 || Billingsley || Youman (0–2) || Saito || 48,567 || 65–88
|- style="background:#fbb;"
| 154 || September 22 || @ Padres || 2–6 || Young || Gorzelanny (2–4) || — || 40,077 || 65–89
|- style="background:#fbb;"
| 155 || September 23 || @ Padres || 1–2 || Peavy || Duke (10–14) || Hoffman || 43,168 || 65–90
|- style="background:#fbb;"
| 156 || September 24 || @ Padres || 1–2 || Hensley || Perez (2–11) || Hoffman || 41,932 || 65–91
|- style="background:#fbb;"
| 157 || September 26 || Astros || 4–7 || Pettitte || Snell (14–11) || — || 17,141 || 65–92
|- style="background:#fbb;"
| 158 || September 27 || Astros || 6–7  || Sampson || Bayliss (1–1) || Miller || 16,352 || 65–93
|- style="background:#fbb;"
| 159 || September 28 || Astros || 0–3 || Oswalt || Gorzelanny (2–5) || Lidge || 12,671 || 65–94
|- style="background:#fbb;"
| 160 || September 29 || Reds || 2–5 || Harang || Duke (10–15) || — || 27,033 || 65–95
|- style="background:#cfc;"
| 161 || September 30 || Reds || 3–0 || McLeary (2–0) || Arroyo || Torres (11) || 35,514 || 66–95

|- style="background:#cfc;"
| 162 || October 1 || Reds || 1–0 || Capps (9–1) || Coffey || Torres (12) || 25,004 || 67–95

|-
| colspan=9 | Legend:       = Win       = LossBold = Pirates team member      Source: baseball-reference.com

Record vs. opponents

Detailed records

Roster

Opening Day lineup

All-Star game

The 2006 Major League Baseball All-Star Game was the 77th playing of the midseason exhibition baseball game between the all-stars of the American League (AL) and National League (NL), the two leagues comprising Major League Baseball. The game was held on July 11, 2006 at PNC Park in Pittsburgh, Pennsylvania, the home of the Pittsburgh Pirates of the National League. The contest was the fifth hosted by the city of Pittsburgh. The game resulted in the American League defeating the National League 3-2, thus awarding the AL champion (which was eventually the Detroit Tigers) home-field advantage in the 2006 World Series.

Statistics
Hitting
Note: G = Games played; AB = At bats; H = Hits; Avg. = Batting average; HR = Home runs; RBI = Runs batted in

Pitching
Note: G = Games pitched; IP = Innings pitched; W = Wins; L = Losses; ERA = Earned run average; SO = Strikeouts

Awards and honors

2006 Major League Baseball All-Star Game
Jason Bay, RF, starter
Freddy Sanchez, 3B, reserve

NL Batting Champion
Freddy Sanchez

Transactions
July 31, 2006: Xavier Nady was traded by the New York Mets to the Pittsburgh Pirates for Roberto Hernandez and Óliver Pérez.

Farm system

References

 2006 Pittsburgh Pirates at Baseball Reference
 2006 Pittsburgh Pirates at Baseball Almanac

Pittsburgh Pirates seasons
Pittsburgh Pirates
Pitts